Bon "John" Phan (born October 10, 1974, in Da Nang, Vietnam) is a Vietnamese-American professional poker player based in Stockton, California, who is a two-time World Series of Poker bracelet winner and is a winner and four-time final tablist of World Poker Tour Championships.

THE JOHN PHAN RULE : With over 100,000 chips already in the pot and the board reading KspadeQspade3diamond5club, Travis Carson moves al-in for 44,200. John Phan is trying to decide whether or not to call-in for his last 30,000 or so.

Phan has tucked his cards in between his chips and the rail for safe keeping while he deliberates. After a while, he asks the dealer if she has a second blue "all-in" button. One of the buttons is in front of Carson, but the second button is still in the well.

Phan tells the dealer he is not going all-in, but he was wondering if he could borrow the button for the minute. The dealer warily hands it to him and he begins to use it as a coin. He gives it a small toss in the air and it lands face-down right in front of him. He tries to give it another small toss and it nearly gets away from him.

On the third toss, Phan hefts it a little higher and it lands face-down on the other side of the betting line. There is a beat before Phan reaches in and pulls the button back.

"That's a call," Carson says. Phan does not seem to agree. A floorman is paged to the table to hear the situation and Phan pleads his case that he told the dealer he was just borrowing the button, not using it to move all-in. The table seems to agree with Carson that it should be ruled a call.

Tournament Director Matt Savage is paged to the table and as soon as he hears that Phan asked for the button, he tells him, "You're all-in." Savage even adds that asking for the button is called "the John Phan rule" before walking away.

Carson flips over his QheartQdiamond for middle set and Phan still doesn't touch his cards. After some more insisting from the dealer and the floor, Phan shows AheartKheart for top pair.

The river 8diamond means Phan is officially eliminated, though he does stick around and plead his case to his tablemates for another minute or so before heading for the door

World Series of Poker 
Phan has made numerous World Series of Poker (WSOP) money finishes, including the final table of the $5,000 Seven-card stud event in 2005, finished fourth and outlasted both professional poker players Dave Colclough and Rob Hollink.

Phan earned $289,389 for his runner-up finish the next year at the 2007 World Series of Poker Phan was runner-up to Francois Safieddine in the $2,500 No Limit Hold'em event, earning $330,846 but it was not until the 2008 World Series of Poker that Phan won his first bracelet after winning the $3,000 No-Limit Hold'em event, earning $434,789 and then he won his second bracelet the same year, this time in the $2,500 2-7 Triple Draw event, earning $151,896. Phan cashed for a total of $608,464 at the 2008 WSOP.

World Series of Poker bracelets

World Poker Tour 
Phan cashed eleven times on the World Poker Tour (WPT) making the final table in four of them,  one was at the $25,000 WPT Championship of season 3, receiving $518,920 for finishing in fourth place above Hollink, Phil Ivey, Joe Beevers, Chris Ferguson and Juha Helppi. and the other was at the $9,600 No Limit Hold'em WPT season 6 event at the 2008 Bay 101 Shooting Stars where he finished 6th, earning $135,000. In July 2008, Phan made another WPT final table finishing in fifth place at the Bellagio Cup IV, earning $193,915

On the WPT seventh season, Phan won his first WPT title after defeating well known online player Amit "Amak316″ Makhija during heads-up play, winning the WPT bracelet and over $1.1 million at the Legends of Poker held at The Bicycle Casino in Bell Gardens, California.

Other poker events 

Phan won two events at The Fifth Annual Jack Binion World Poker Open in 2004, the $500 Limit Hold'em event, earning $160,965 and $500 Pot Limit Hold'em event, earning $85,257 also cashing three other times at that same event. He later won the $3,000 No Limit Hold'em event at the Festa al Lago II in 2004, earning $189,900. He won the $2,425 No Limit Hold'em event at the 2005 L.A. Poker Classic, earning $300,578 and was runner-up to Marcel Lüske in the $3,000 No Limit Hold'em event at the Fourth Annual Five-Star World Poker Classic in 2006, earning $179,195.

As of 2017, his total live tournament winnings exceed $5,525,000. His 29 cashes as the WSOP account for over $1,450,000 of those winnings.

He was the Cardplayer Magazine 2008 Player of the Year with 6,704 points as well as 2008 Bluff Magazine Player of the Year.

Notes

American poker players
Living people
World Series of Poker bracelet winners
World Poker Tour winners
Vietnamese poker players
American people of Vietnamese descent
1974 births